Laurel Hill is an unincorporated community in northwestern Lincoln County, North Carolina, United States, north of Toluca. It is located north of Toluca, at the intersection of North Carolina Highways 10, and 18.

References

Unincorporated communities in Lincoln County, North Carolina
Unincorporated communities in North Carolina